Le Barcarès  XIII are a French Rugby league club based in Le Barcares, Pyrénées Orientales in the Languedoc-Roussillon region. The club plays in Pool B of the Languedoc-Roussillon League in the French National Division 2.

Club honours
Elite 2
Winners – 1990, 2006
Runners Up – 1989
French National 2
Winners – 1996
Runners Up - 2002
Fédéral Championship
Winners – 1987, 1992
Coupe Falcou
Winners - 1999

See also

National Division 2

French rugby league teams
1976 establishments in France
Rugby clubs established in 1976